Sonia Ben Ammar (born 19 February 1999), also credited as Sonia Ammar, is a Tunisian-French model, singer, and actress, who is signed with IMG Models. She has appeared on several magazine covers, including Vanity Fair and L'Officiel.

Ben Ammar released her debut extended play Sonia (2019) to positive reviews from critics. She played the role of Liv McKenzie in the slasher film Scream (2022), which was a critical and commercial success.

Early life
Sonia Ben Ammar was born in Paris on 19 February 1999. She is the daughter of film producer Tarak Ben Ammar and actress Beata ( Sonczuk). Her mother is of Polish descent, while her Tunisian-born father is of paternal Berber and maternal Corsican descent. He was raised Muslim; his own mother converted to Islam from Catholicism. Her paternal great-aunt (paternal grandfather's sister) Wassila Ben Ammar was the wife of the first President of Tunisia, Habib Bourguiba.

She graduated from the American School of Paris and started attending the University of Southern California in fall 2017.

Career
In 2012, Ben Ammar made her acting debut in a role in the stage musical 1789: Les Amants de la Bastille. In 2013, she appeared in the film Jappeloup.

In 2016, she signed with IMG Models and has since modeled for Dolce & Gabbana, Miu Miu, Carolina Herrera, Topshop, Nina Ricci and Chanel. She has also appeared in magazines such as Vanity Fair, Harper's Bazaar Arabia, Love, and L'Officiel.

Ben Ammar made her musical debut as a featured artist in Petit Biscuit's song "Creation Come Alive" in 2017. Two years later, Ben Ammar released her debut single "Joyride", which served as the lead track of her debut extended play, Sonia, which was released in November 2019 and earned positive reviews from critics. Paper magazine wrote that she was "fitting nicely into the dark-pop scene" and went on to compare her to the likes of Halsey and Banks.

In September 2020, it was announced that Ben Ammar would star as Liv McKenzie in the fifth Scream feature film (2022), which was directed by Matt Bettinelli-Olpin and Tyler Gillett. To prepare for the role, she told Vogue Arabia that she "rewatched every interview and really got into my character. It’s funny, I actually read the script so many times and knew everyone else’s scenes by heart. This was an ongoing joke on-set." The film was released on 14 January 2022 to critical and commercial success.

Filmography

Film

Theater

Discography

Extended plays

Singles

As featured artist

Other appearances

Notes

References

External links

Living people
1999 births
21st-century French singers
Actresses from Paris
American University of Paris alumni
French female models
French people of Arab descent
French people of Tunisian descent
French people of Corsican descent
French people of Polish descent
IMG Models models
Singers from Paris
Tunisian female models
University of Southern California alumni
Berklee College of Music alumni
21st-century French women
Models from Paris
French people of Italian descent